Lafayette Washington Groves (April 11, 1834 – November 8, 1872) was an American newspaper editor.

Groves, son of David Groves, was born in Sumner County, Tenn., April 11, 1834. His father emigrated to Lafayette County, Mo., in 1835, and the son spent three years in the Masonic College in Lexington, in the same county, before entering Yale College in the Junior year, graduating in 1855.  Returning home after graduation, he studied law in the office of Judge John Ryland, of Lexington, was admitted to the bar in 1857, and began practice in St. Joseph, where he remained about eighteen months.  He then went to Mississippi, and took charge of a High School, in Cayuga, Hinds County, and was thus engaged at the beginning of the war. He then returned to Missouri, and entered the Southern army, under the command of Gen. Sterling Price. After the close of the war he spent some time at home, and in 1868 was elected Professor of Languages in Richmond College, at Richmond, Mo., where he continued until 1870. In the spring of 1871 he purchased the Lexington Intelligencer, and was its editor until his death He was assassinated, on the streets of Lexington, on the 8th of Nov., 1872, by Edwin Turner, the publisher of a rival paper, the Lexington Register, who had been severely denounced by  Groves for printing a slanderous personal attack upon him.

External links

1834 births
1872 deaths
People from Sumner County, Tennessee
Yale College alumni
Missouri lawyers
Confederate States Army personnel
American newspaper editors
19th-century American lawyers